Serixia griseipennis is a species of beetle in the family Cerambycidae. It was described by Gressitt in 1938.

References

Serixia
Beetles described in 1938